The 13th Syracuse Grand Prix was a motor race, run to Formula One rules, held on 12 April 1964 at Syracuse Circuit, Sicily. The race was run over 40 laps of the circuit, reduced from the original race distance of 56 laps due to bad weather, after lobbying from Jo Bonnier on behalf of the GPDA. The race was won easily by British driver John Surtees in a Ferrari 158.

Jo Siffert was injured in a crash during the practice sessions, in which he rolled his Lotus 24.

During the race, Peter Arundell's Lotus developed gearbox trouble, and he swapped cars with Mike Spence. Arundell took the healthy Lotus to third place after a close fight with Lorenzo Bandini, while Spence retired the other one soon after the swap.

Results

The first session practice times for Arundell and Spence were disallowed as punishment for missing scrutineering. The first session was dry, and the second was wet, so their times in the wet resulted in their low grid positions.

References
 "The Grand Prix Who's Who", Steve Small, 1995.
 "The Formula One Record Book", John Thompson, 1974.
 Race results at www.silhouet.com 

Syracuse Grand Prix
Syracuse Grand Prix
Syracuse Grand Prix
Syracuse Grand Prix